

Former OCTA Routes 
Routes with numbers that used to runs back in the OCTA bus routes history which is eliminations on the OCTA bus routes. Former Orange County Transportation Authority bus routes in Orange County, California.

1-99 (Local Routes)

20-70 (Alternative Routes)

50-60 (Xpress Routes)

100s (Community Routes)

200s (OC Express)

400s (StationLink Bus Routes)

700s (Intercounty Express)

References

Orange County Transportation Authority